Pachakutiq (Quechua), Pachakutik (Kichwa) or Pachakuti (Hispanicized spellings Pachacutec, Pachacútec, Pachacuti) may refer to:

 Pachacuti, an Inca emperor
 Pachakutiq (Arequipa-Moquegua), a mountain on the border of the Arequipa Region and the Moquegua Region, Peru
 Pachakutiq (Cusco), a mountain in the Cusco Region, Peru
 Pachakutiq (Moquegua), a mountain in the Moquegua Region, Peru
 Pachakutiq (Puno), a mountain in the Puno Region, Peru

See also 
 Pachakutiq (Agents of S.H.I.E.L.D.), a character from Agents of S.H.I.E.L.D.
 Pachakuti Indigenous Movement
 Pachakutik Plurinational Unity Movement – New Country
 Carry Somers, for Pachacuti Hat Brand